Riku Markus Hahl (born November 1, 1980) is a Finnish former professional ice hockey centre, who played most notably for HPK in the Finnish Liiga and the Colorado Avalanche in the National Hockey League (NHL).

Playing career
Hahl was drafted 183rd overall in the 1999 NHL Entry Draft by the Colorado Avalanche.

Before coming to North America, Hahl played for his hometown team, HPK, in the Finnish SM-liiga, and was known for his defensive skills as a forward. In the autumn of 2000, Hahl left for Colorado, where he impressed the Avalanche coaches at training camp and was rewarded with 43 games in the NHL in the following season, including 21 playoff games. In his NHL career, Hahl played a total of 92 regular season games scoring five goals for a total of thirteen points. He also played 34 playoff games, recording two goals and four assists.

During the 2004–05 NHL lockout Hahl played for HPK, and represented HC Davos in the Swiss NLA during the 2005–06 season. Hahl represented Finland at the 2004 World Cup of Hockey and scored his first goal on the national team in the final against Team Canada.

Hahl signed with Timrå IK of Elitserien in the spring of 2006, and completed a two-year deal with the Medelpad team before leaving in 2008 for Frölunda HC.

After three seasons with Frölunda as an alternate captain, Hahl returned to Finland to play for Jokerit, signing a two-year deal on May 19, 2011.

Hahl played four seasons with Jokerit, including the last campaign within the Kontinental Hockey League, before opting to return to his original club in the Liiga with HPK on an optional two-year contract on July 24, 2015.

Career statistics

Regular season and playoffs

International

References

External links

1980 births
Colorado Avalanche draft picks
Colorado Avalanche players
Finnish ice hockey centres
Frölunda HC players
HC Davos players
Hershey Bears players
HPK players
Jokerit players
Living people
People from Hämeenlinna
Timrå IK players
Sportspeople from Kanta-Häme